Gözde Kansu (born 23 August 1980) is a Turkish actress.

Kansu studied at İzmir Tevfik Fikret High School. She is a graduate of Dokuz Eylül University School of Fine Arts with a degree in theatre studies.

She first started learning ballet and later got involved in theatre and music projects at her school. She then worked for the Istanbul City Theatres and was invited to join them on stage during a tour of Antalya. 

She was cast in adaptations of Turkish classic novels Dudaktan Kalbe, Hanımın Çiftliği, Al Yazmalım. In the beginning of her career, she had guest roles in many hit series "Ayrılsak da Beraberiz", "En Son Babalar Duyar", "Kurşun Yarası, "Çiçek Taksi". She was cast in hit films "Issız Adam", "Abuzer Kadayıf".

Filmography

References

External links 
 
 

1980 births
Turkish voice actresses
Turkish television actresses
Turkish stage actresses
Turkish film actresses
Dokuz Eylül University alumni
Actresses from İzmir
Living people